San Juan is a district of the Tibás canton, in the San José province of Costa Rica.

Geography 
San Juan has an area of  km² and an elevation of  metres.

Demographics 

For the 2011 census, San Juan had a population of  inhabitants.

Transportation

Road transportation 
The district is covered by the following road routes:
 National Route 5
 National Route 32
 National Route 39
 National Route 101
 National Route 102
 National Route 117

Rail transportation 
The Interurbano Line operated by Incofer is part of the border of this district with Colima district in the same canton.

References 

Districts of San José Province
Populated places in San José Province